The 1988 United States Senate election in Montana took place on November 8, 1988. Incumbent United States Senator John Melcher, who was first elected to the Senate in 1976 and was re-elected in 1982, ran for re-election. After winning the Democratic primary, he faced Yellowstone County Commissioner Conrad Burns in the general election, and a grueling campaign followed. Ultimately, Melcher was narrowly defeated in his bid for re-election by Burns, who became the first Republican Senator from Montana in 36 years since Zales Ecton lost re-election in 1952.

Democratic primary

Candidates 
 John Melcher, incumbent U.S. Senator
 Bob Kelleher, perennial candidate

Results

Republican primary

Candidates 
 Conrad Burns, Yellowstone County Commissioner
 Tom Faranda

Results

General election

Results

See also 
  1988 United States Senate elections

References 

1988 Montana elections
Montana
1988